Lycodesmus superbus is a species of beetle in the family Cerambycidae, and the only species in the genus Lycodesmus. It was described by Melzer in 1927.

References

Hemilophini
Beetles described in 1927